The 2016 Plymouth City Council election took place on 5 May 2016 to elect members of Plymouth City Council in England. The Conservatives gained one seat from Labour, resulting in both parties having twenty-seven members of the council. A coalition of Conservative and UKIP members took overall control of the Council, having thirty members in total and a working majority.

Background 
Plymouth City Council held local elections on 5 May 2016 along with councils across the United Kingdom as part of the 2016 local elections. The council elects its councillors in thirds, with a third being up for election every year for three years, with no election in the fourth year. Councillors defending their seats in this election were previously elected in 2012. In that election, twelve Labour candidates and seven Conservative candidates were elected.

Ahead of this election, the council was under no overall control with Labour running a minority administration. The party had the largest number of seats, but was one seat short of a majority.

The election was also contested by the Plymouth Independents, a new political party formed by former UKIP members. The party won no seats, and has subsequently been dissolved having contested no further elections.

Overall results

|}

Note: All changes in vote share are in comparison to the corresponding 2012 election.

At the previous election the composition of the council was:

After the election the composition of the council was:

Ward results
Asterisks denote sitting councillors seeking re-election.

Budshead

Compton

Devonport

Efford and Lipson

Eggbuckland

Ham

Honicknowle

Moor View

Peverell

Plympton Chaddlewood

Plympton Erle

Plympton St Mary

Plymstock Dunstone

Plymstock Radford

Southway

St Budeaux

St Peter and the Waterfront

Stoke

Sutton and Mount Gould

Aftermath
After the election, the Conservatives and Labour held twenty-seven seats on the council each, with the other three held by UKIP councillors. Labour group leader Tudor Evans had led the council before the election, but the result cast control of the council into doubt. A coalition between the Conservatives and UKIP took control, with Conservative group leader Ian Bowyer becoming the new leader of the council.

References

2016 English local elections
2016
2010s in Devon